C. Anthony Muse (born Charles Anthony Muse on April 17, 1958) is an American politician and minister from Maryland and a member of the Democratic Party. He is a member of the Maryland Senate, representing Maryland's District 26 in southern Prince George's County. He is also the senior pastor of the Ark of Safety Christian Church in Upper Marlboro, Maryland. In the 2012 U.S. Senate election in Maryland, Muse unsuccessfully challenged incumbent Ben Cardin in the Democratic primary, receiving about 16% of the vote to Cardin's 74%.

Early life, education, and pastoral career
Muse grew up in Park Heights, a working-class Baltimore, Maryland neighborhood.

Muse has never met his biological father and only learned the man's name when he was an adult and got a copy of his birth certificate. His teenage mother, Gloria Watson, had four boys and a girl by the time of Muse's birth in 1958. Watson married a violent man who beat him, his siblings and his mother. When Muse was twelve Watson announced to the children that they were moving to Alabama to join a revival group and escape their abusive stepfather. On the day they were supposed to leave, Muse packed a suitcase and ran away. For a few months, he lived with an older brother. Then, he said, he passed through 11 foster families in two years. Muse left some of the homes after fighting with the children, or the foster parents. He was thrown out of Pimlico Junior High School, he said, after jumping up on a lunchroom table, kicking over students' lunches and starting a melee. His last stop on the foster care circuit was the home of the Rev. George Stansbury, a United Methodist Church minister whom he credits with imposing order on his life. As a teen he was hanging with the wrong crowd and Rev Stansbury saved Muse from a drug dealer that was going to harm him.

By age 20, Muse was a United Methodist minister, assigned to Mount Zion UMC in Ellicott City. His youthfulness, his Afro and red Gremlin vehicle, surprised his new congregants. However Muse won them over with his dramatic preaching and by adding a guitar and drums to the service. Long before he earned his degrees he'd sign cards "Dr. C. Anthony Muse" to Nina Ringgold, a congregant who gave him money and cooked for him.

After graduating from Morgan State University in Baltimore, he received a master's in divinity from Wesley Theological Seminary in Washington DC; then a doctorate degree of Ministry from Howard University. Muse is a member of Kappa Alpha Psi fraternity.

Muse is married to WRC-TV news anchor Pat Lawson-Muse. Together they have adopted daughter Lynell.

Muse worked as a pastor at a number of United Methodist churches before founding the Ark of Safety Christian Church in Upper Marlboro, Maryland.

Maryland legislature

Elections
Muse was originally elected to the Maryland House of Delegates in 1994 with 27% of the vote, representing District 26 in southern Prince George's County. He only served one term in the House, not running for re-election in 1998. He ran for Prince George's County Executive in 2002 and lost the Democratic primary. In 2006, Muse ran for an open seat in the Maryland Senate and in the Democratic primary defeated fellow State Representative Obie Patterson 55%-45%. In the general election, he won unopposed. Muse was reelected to the Maryland state senate in 2010 and 2014. Instead of running for a fourth state senate term in 2018, Muse ran unsuccessfully for Prince George's County Executive.

Tenure
In the Maryland legislature, Muse criticized the congressional and legislative redistricting processes as being overly partisan and discriminatory toward black voters. He has tried to expand financial literacy, protect domestic violence victims, and provide more rights to noncustodial parents. He has also been heavily involved in issues affecting Prince George's and his district, including attempts to revitalize Rosecroft Raceway in Fort Washington; in 2010, Muse sponsored unsuccessful legislation to legalize gambling on card games at the horse track. He also initially opposed allowing a casino at National Harbor, Maryland, favoring instead locating a casino at Rosecroft. Muse is also known for strong social-conservative viewpoints, including strong opposition in 2011 and 2012 to the Civil Marriage Protection Act and the 2012 Question 6 referendum on same-sex marriage. However, in 2014, Muse voted to ban discrimination based on gender identity after opposing a similar bill the prior year.

Committee assignments
During his time in the house, he served on the Ways and Means Committee and as chaplain of the Maryland Legislative Black Caucus. Muse currently sits on the Senate Finance Committee. He was a member of the Task Force to Study County Property-Tax Setoffs and Related Fiscal Issues in 1997 and a member of the Bi-County Affairs Committee of Prince George's County Delegation.

2012 U.S. Senate election

In January 2012, Muse announced he would seek to be the Democratic candidate in the 2012 Maryland U.S. Senate race, challenging incumbent Sen. Ben Cardin. In the April 3 Democratic primary, Muse came in second with 15.7% of the vote.

References

External links

Democratic Party Maryland state senators
Democratic Party members of the Maryland House of Delegates
Living people
1958 births
Morgan State University alumni
Wesley Theological Seminary alumni
Politicians from Baltimore
African-American state legislators in Maryland
21st-century American politicians
American United Methodist clergy
20th-century Methodist ministers
21st-century Methodist ministers
African-American Methodists
20th-century American clergy
21st-century American clergy
20th-century African-American people
21st-century African-American politicians